The Loves of Paris and Helen is a 1788 oil-on-canvas painting by the French Neoclassical artist Jacques-Louis David, showing Helen of Troy and Paris from Homer's Iliad. It is now in the Louvre Museum.

The painting was the result of a commission from the comte d'Artois. It shows David in his 'galante' phase and was interpreted as a satire on the manners of the comte d'Artois. The caryatids in the background are copies of those by Jean Goujon in the Louvre.

External links
Cartelfr.louvre.fr
Étienne Coche de La Ferté and Julien Guey, "Analyse archéologique et psychologique d'un tableau de David : Les Amours de Pâris et d'Hélène", Revue archéologique, vol. XL, 1952, p. 129-61

Mythological paintings by Jacques-Louis David
1788 paintings
Paintings in the Louvre by French artists
Paintings depicting Greek myths
Musical instruments in art
Paintings based on the Iliad